Ruth Kathleen Frances Bushyager ( Twitchen; born 1977) is a British Anglican bishop. Since July 2020, she has served as Bishop of Horsham, a suffragan bishop in the Diocese of Chichester.

Ordained ministry
Bushyager was ordained in the Church of England as a deacon in 2005 and as a priest in 2006. From 2014 to 2020, she was Vicar of St Paul's Church, Dorking in the Diocese of Guildford. She previously served in parish ministry in the Dioceses of Southwell and Nottingham and of Oxford, as a school chaplain, and as a missioner in the Diocese of London.

Episcopal ministry
In April 2020, Bushyager was announced as the next Bishop of Horsham, a suffragan bishop in the Diocese of Chichester. She is the first woman to serve as a bishop in the diocese. Her consecration as a bishop took place on the morning of 15 July 2020, in the Chapel of Lambeth Palace. The principal consecrator was Sarah Mullally, Bishop of London, making her the first female bishop in the Church of England to be consecrated by a bishop who is female.

Views
In 2023, following the news that the House of Bishop's of the Church of England was to introduce proposals for blessing same-sex relationships, she signed an open letter which stated:

References

1977 births
Living people
Bishops of Horsham
21st-century Church of England bishops
Women Anglican bishops